Caloptilia vacciniella is a moth of the family Gracillariidae. It is known from Quebec, Canada, and Pennsylvania, Maine and Michigan in the United States.

The larvae feed on Vaccinium species, including Vaccinium angustifolium, Vaccinium corymbosum and Vaccinium pallidum. They mine the leaves of their host plant.

References

vacciniella
Moths of North America
Moths described in 1915